Ziyue or Zi Yue may refer to:

Confucianism
Zǐyuē (子曰), set phrase "Confucius said" in Analects

Calendar
zǐyuè (子月), month in sexagenary cycle

People
Zǐyuè (籽月), "Seed Moon" pseudonym of popular female youth novelist and screenwriter If I Were You (2012 Chinese film)
Liu Ziyue (劉子悅), prince Ziyue, executed 466, one of many children of Emperor Xiaowu of Liu Song
Sun Ziyue (孙子玥), Chinese tennis player
Zhao Ziyue (趙子曰), "Confucius-said Zhao" titular character of 1927 comic novel Zhao Ziyue by Lao She

Music
Ziyue (band), "Confucius Said" Beijing punk band of the 90s